William Claiborne Owens (October 17, 1849 – November 18, 1925) was a U.S. Representative from Kentucky.

Born near Georgetown, Kentucky, Owens attended the common schools, also Kentucky Wesleyan College, Millersburg, Kentucky, Transylvania University, Lexington, Kentucky, and was graduated from Columbia Law School, New York City, in 1872.
He was admitted to the bar in the same year and commenced practice in Georgetown, Kentucky. He served as prosecuting attorney for Scott County, Kentucky from 1874 to 1877, when he resigned. He served as member of the Kentucky House of Representatives 1877–1887 and served as speaker in 1882 and 1883. He served as delegate to the 1892 Democratic National Convention.

Owens was elected as a Democrat to the Fifty-fourth Congress (March 4, 1895 – March 3, 1897). He was not a candidate for renomination in 1896. He became affiliated with the Republican Party in 1896. Major in the Second Regiment, Kentucky Volunteers, during the Spanish–American War in 1898. He moved to Louisville, Kentucky, in 1900 and resumed the practice of law. He died in Louisville, Kentucky, November 18, 1925. He was interred in Georgetown Cemetery, Georgetown, Kentucky.

References

1849 births
1925 deaths
American military personnel of the Spanish–American War
American people of Welsh descent
Columbia Law School alumni
Kentucky lawyers
People from Scott County, Kentucky
Politicians from Louisville, Kentucky
Speakers of the Kentucky House of Representatives
Republican Party members of the Kentucky House of Representatives
Transylvania University alumni
Democratic Party members of the United States House of Representatives from Kentucky
19th-century American lawyers